Savkovo is a rural locality (a village) in Turgenevskoye Rural Settlement, Melenkovsky District, Vladimir Oblast, Russia. The population was 179 as of 2010. There are 3 streets.

Geography 
Savkovo is located 15 km northeast of Melenki (the district's administrative centre) by road. Selino is the nearest rural locality.

References 

Rural localities in Melenkovsky District